Efraín Forero Triviño (4 March 1930 – 12 September 2022) was a Colombian road racing cyclist.

Forero or El Zipa as he was known was involved in the organisation of the first Vuelta a Colombia. He was chosen to ride between the cities of Fresno and Manizales, via Páramo de Letras, as a preliminary race, and to define the route of the tour. The following year, 1951, the first Vuelta a Colombia took place. It was a 1,233 kilometers race which was divided in 10 stages, including 3 days off. Forero won this first Vuelta a Colombia. He won seven stages along the way. He would win a further three stages and would finish 4th overall in 1953 and 1954 as well as second overall in the 1957 Vuelta a Colombia behind Spaniard José Gómez del Moral.

Major results

1950
 1st  Road race, National Road Championships
 1st  Team pursuit, Central American and Caribbean Games
1951
 1st  Overall Vuelta a Colombia
1st Stages 1, 2, 3, 6, 7, 8 & 10
1952
 1st Stage 5 Vuelta a Colombia
 2nd Road race, National Road Championships
1953
 1st  Road race, National Road Championships
 4th Overall Vuelta a Colombia
1st Stage 1
1954
 1st  Road race, National Road Championships
 1st  Team time trial, Central American and Caribbean Games (with Héctor Mesa, Justo Londoño and Ramón Hoyos)
 4th Overall Vuelta a Colombia
1st Stage 15
1956
 3rd Overall Vuelta a Colombia
1957
 2nd Overall Vuelta a Colombia
1958
 1st  Road race, National Road Championships
1959
 1st  Team time trial, Central American and Caribbean Games (with Pablo Hurtado and Ramón Hoyos)

References

1930 births
2022 deaths
Colombian male cyclists
People from Zipaquirá
20th-century Colombian people